The Black Reel Awards for Television, or "BRATs", is an annual American awards ceremony hosted by the Foundation for the Augmentation of African-Americans in Film (FAAAF) to recognize excellence of African-Americans, as well as the television achievements of the African diaspora, in the global television industry, as assessed by the Foundation's voting membership. The various category winners are awarded a copy of a statuette, officially called the Black Reel Award. The awards, first presented in 2017 in Washington, D.C., are overseen by FAAAF.

The BRATs, a spin-off of the Black Reel Awards or BRAs was announced on via its website on June 5, 2017. The inaugural "BRATs"  consisted of 25 categories focusing primarily on dramas, comedies, as well as movies/limited series. The award will honor African-Americans and those of African descent performers as well as those working in various aspects of network and cable television production. The Television Movie and Television Documentary categories, which were previously honored at the BRAs were moved to the BRATs.

The 1st Annual Black Reel Awards for Television were held on August 5, 2017, where The New Edition Story came out the big winner, winning 5 awards including Outstanding Television Movie or Limited Series.

Black Reel Awards Statuette

Drama
Black Reel Award for Outstanding Actor, Drama Series: since 2017
Black Reel Award for Outstanding Actress, Drama Series: since 2017
Black Reel Award for Outstanding Supporting Actor, Drama Series: since 2017
Black Reel Award for Outstanding Supporting Actress, Drama Series: since 2017

TV Movie or Limited Series
 Outstanding Television Movie or Limited Series: since 2000
 Outstanding Director of a Television Movie or Limited Series: since 2000
 Outstanding Actor in a Television Movie or Limited Series: since 2000
 Outstanding Actress in a Television Movie or Limited Series: since 2000
 Outstanding Supporting Actor in a Television Movie or Limited Series: since 2000
 Outstanding Supporting Actress in a Television Movie or Limited Series: since 2000
 Outstanding Screenplay of a Television Movie or Limited Series: since 2000
 Outstanding Television Documentary or Special: since 2015

Ceremonies

See also
Black Filmmakers Hall of Fame
Black Reel Awards

References

External links
Official Website
The Foundation for the Augmentation of African-Americans in Film

 
American television awards
Awards established in 2017